Westoe Dam is a concrete-gravity type dam located on the Usutu River near Amsterdam, Mpumalanga, South Africa. It was established in 1968 and has been renovated in 1973. The dam serves mainly for municipal and industrial water supply and its hazard potential has been ranked high (3).

See also
List of reservoirs and dams in South Africa
List of rivers of South Africa

References 

 List of South African Dams from the Department of Water Affairs and Forestry (South Africa)

Dams in South Africa
Dams completed in 1968